International Mother Language Day, is a worldwide annual observance held on 21 February to promote awareness of linguistic and cultural diversity and to promote multilingualism. First announced by UNESCO on 17 November 1999, it was formally recognized by the United Nations General Assembly with the adoption of UN resolution 56/262 in 2002. Mother Language Day is part of a broader initiative "to promote the preservation and protection of all languages used by peoples of the world" as adopted by the UN General Assembly on 16 May 2007 in UN resolution 61/266, which also established 2008 as the International Year of Languages.
The idea to celebrate International Mother Language Day was the initiative of Bangladesh. In Bangladesh, 21 February is the anniversary of the day when the people of Bangladesh (then East Bengal of Pakistan) fought for recognition of the Bengali language. It is observed all over the world.

History 

21 February was declared to be International Mother Language Day by UNESCO in 1999. It has been observed throughout the world since 21 February 2000. The declaration came up in tribute to the Language Movement done by the Bangladeshis (then the East Pakistanis).

When Pakistan was created in 1947, it had two geographically separate parts: East Pakistan (currently known as Bangladesh) and West Pakistan (currently known as Pakistan). The two parts were very different from each other in the sense of culture and language. The two parts were also separated by India in between.

In 1948, the Government of Pakistan declared Urdu to be the sole national language of Pakistan, even though Bengali or Bangla was spoken by the majority of people combining East Pakistan and West Pakistan. The East Pakistan people protested since the majority of the population was from East Pakistan and their mother language was Bangla. They demanded Bangla to be at least one of the national languages, in addition to Urdu. The demand was raised first by Dhirendranath Datta from East Pakistan on 23 February 1948, in the constituent Assembly of Pakistan.

To demolish the protest, the government of Pakistan outlawed public meeting and rallies. The students of the University of Dhaka, with the support of the general public, arranged massive rallies and meetings. On 21 February 1952, police opened fire on rallies. Abdus Salam, Abul Barkat, Rafiq Uddin Ahmed, Abdul Jabbar and Shafiur Rahman died, with hundreds of others injured. This was a rare incident in history, where people sacrificed their lives for their mother tongue.

Since then, Bangladeshis celebrate the International Mother Language Day as one of their tragic days. They visit the Shaheed Minar, a monument built in memory of the martyrs and its replicas to express their deep sorrow, respect and gratitude  to them.

International Mother Language Day is a national holiday in Bangladesh.  The resolution was suggested by Rafiqul Islam and Abdus Salam, Bengalis living in Vancouver, Canada. They wrote a letter to Kofi Annan on 9 January 1998 asking him to take a step for saving the world's languages from extinction by declaring an International Mother Language Day. Rafiq proposed the date as 21 February to commemorate the 1952 killings in Dhaka during the Language Movement.

Rafiqul Islam's proposal was introduced in the Bangladesh parliament and in due course (at the behest of Prime Minister Sheikh Hasina) a formal proposal was submitted to UNESCO by the Government of Bangladesh. The process of shepherding the proposal through UNESCO's regulatory system was undertaken by Syed Muazzem Ali, then Bangladesh ambassador to France and Permanent Representative to UNESCO, and Tozammel Tony Huq, his predecessor, who was then a Special Adviser to UNESCO Secretary General Federico Mayor. Finally on 17 November 1999, the 30th General Assembly of UNESCO unanimously resolved that "21st February be proclaimed International Mother Language Day throughout the world to commemorate the martyrs who sacrificed their lives on this very day in 1952."

Timeline 

 1952: Bengali Language Movement
 1955: Language Movement Day first observed in Bangladesh
 1999: UNESCO proclaims 21 February (Ekushey February) as International Mother Language Day
 2000: Inaugural celebration of International Mother Language Day
 2002: Linguistic-diversity theme, featuring 3,000 endangered languages (motto: In the galaxy of languages, every word is a star.)
 2004: Children-learning theme; the UNESCO observance included "a unique exhibition of children’s exercise books from around the world illustrating the process by which children learn and master the use of written literacy skills in the classroom".
 2005: Braille and sign languages
 2006: Annual theme: "Languages and cyberspace"
 2007: Annual theme: Multilingual education
 2008: International Year of Languages
 2010: International Year for the Rapprochement of Cultures
 2012: Mother-tongue instruction and inclusive education
 2013: Annual theme: "Books for mother tongue education"
 2014: Annual theme: "Local languages for global citizenship: spotlight on science"
 2015: Annual theme: "Inclusion in and through education: language counts"
 2016: Annual theme: "Quality education, language(s) of instruction and learning outcomes"
 2017: Annual theme: "Toward sustainable futures through multilingual education"
 2018: Our languages, our assets.
 2019: International Year of Indigenous Languages
 2020: Annual theme: "Safeguarding linguistic diversity"
2021: Annual theme: "Fostering multilingualism for inclusion in education and society"

 2022: Annual theme: "Using technology for multilingual learning: Challenges and opportunities"|

 2023: Annual theme: "Multilingual education: A necessity to transform education"

Observances 
UNESCO chooses a theme for each International Mother Language Day, and sponsors related events at its Paris headquarters. In 2008, the International Year of Languages began on International Mother Language Day. It is celebrated in Chile, Russia, the Philippines, Egypt and Canada.

Bangladesh 

Bangladeshis celebrate International Mother Language Day by placing flowers at the Martyrs' Monument and its replicas. A public holiday in the country since 1953, it is also known as Shohid Dibôsh (Martyr Day). On 17 November 1999, the UNESCO General Conference recognized 21 February as International Mother Language Day. Bangladeshis organize social gatherings honoring their language and culture, hold literary competitions, draw alpana on the roads, eat festive meals and listen to songs. Bangla Academy arranges Ekushey Book Fair in Dhaka for the whole month of February.

Canada 

International Mother Language Day was introduced to the Parliament of Canada for recognition by Matthew Kellway on 5 February 2014 as a private member's bill, C-573.

In 2015, British Columbia and Manitoba issued proclamations observing International Mother Language Day on 21 February.
Edmonton observed International Mother Language Day on 21 February 2017.
Edmonton Ekushey observed by Bangladesh Heritage & Ethnic Society and Diverse Edmonton with due respect in Edmonton on 23 February 2020.

India 
As part of Digital India initiative, digitized content will be made available in the country's 22 scheduled languages and extended to India's other 234 recognized languages. Digitization began in June 2016 through the Bharatavani Project at the Central Institute of Indian Languages in Mysore, and by February 2017 content in 60 Indian languages had been made available free of charge.

United States 
The Mother Tongue Film Festival in Washington, D.C., has been held since 2017 to coincide with Mother Languages Day.

United Kingdom 
A replica of Dhaka's Shaheed Minar was built in London in 1999 in Altab Ali Park, Whitechapel. Members of the community come here to mark International Mother Language Day by laying wreaths and singing revolutionary songs.

There is also a Shaheed Minar replica in Westwood, Greater Manchester. Community members come from across North England to mark International Mother Language Day at the monument.

Awards

Linguapax Prize 
The Linguapax Prize is awarded annually on IMLD by the Linguapax Institute in Barcelona. The prize recognizes outstanding achievement in the preservation of linguistic diversity, the revitalization of linguistic communities and the promotion of multilingualism.

Ekushey Heritage Award 

The annual Ekushey Heritage Award, introduced in 2014 by the Bangladesh Heritage and Ethnic Society of Alberta (BHESA), recognizes outstanding achievement in fields such as education, social work and community service. The award is announced on International Mother Language Day.

Ekushey Youth Award 
The Ekushey Youth Award, introduced in 2015 by Alberta's Mahinur Jahid Memorial Foundation (MJMF) and announced on IMLD, is awarded annually to recipients who inspire youth in the fields of education, sports, youth activities, literature, and community service. The award is open Alberta residents.

Gallery

See also

 United Nations
 First language
 Language festival
 Linguistic rights
 Universal Declaration of Linguistic Rights
 Official languages of the United Nations
 International Day of the African Child
 European Day of Languages 26 September
 International Day of Education
 International Day of the World's Indigenous Peoples
 World Day for Cultural Diversity for Dialogue and Development

References

External links
 UNESCO homepage for International Mother Language Day
 United Nations homepage for IMLD

February observances
Observances in Bangladesh
Mother Language Day, International